Neena Kurup is an Indian actress who appears in Malayalam films. She is most well known for her roles as Aswathy in Sreedharante Onnam Thirumurivu (1987) and Karishma in Punjabi House (1998). She has acted in many television serials after taking a break from films.

Personal life

Neena is the daughter of Advocate Victor V. Damodar and Radha Padmam. She is married to Kannan, whose official name is Sunil Kumar and is an exporter from Kochi. The couple has a 22-year-old daughter Pavithra, now doing her Masters in London, UK. Neena has three elder sisters and a younger brother.

Filmography

Television  

Neena has acted in nearly 75 serials. Some are mentioned below.
 Serials

Manassinakkare (Surya TV) as Swamini 2021
Kaliveedu (Surya TV) as Arunima 2021
 Chackoyum Maryyum (Mazhavil Manorama) as Alice 2020
 Bhagyajathakam (TV series) (Mazhavil Manorama) as Vasanthi 2018
 Guru (Jaihind TV) 2017
Gowri (Surya TV) 2018
Jagratha (Amrita TV) 2016
Aathira (Tamil- Sun TV) as Suseela 2014
John De Panic (Mazhavil Manorama) 2011
Hridhayam Saakshi (Mazhavil Manorama) as Seema 2013
Aayirathil Oruval (Mazhavil Manorama) 2013
Indu Lekha (Media One) 2015
Pathinu Pathu (Surya TV) 2013
Sreekrishnan (Surya TV) 2012
Chakravakam (Surya TV) 2011
Nandanam (Surya TV) 2007
Nilapakshi (Kairali TV) as Saradha 2013
Innale (Surya TV) 2013
Culcutta Hospital (Surya TV) 2004
Paying Guest (Asianet) 1997
Michaelinte Sandhathikal as Lekha 1995
Kanakachilanga 1994
Gopika 1996 
Manasi 1996
Eka Tharakam 1997
Koomankolli 1999
Dhambathyam 1998
Meghasangeetham 2004
Soumini 1998
Periyattin Theerathu 1997
Pravesham 2000
Ladies Hostel 1997
Manjukaalam Mohicha Penkutty 1998
Ushasandhya
Samaksham
Karppooram
Midukki
Ponnum Poovum 2010

 Telefilms
 Parppidam as Lathika  
 Nanma Niranja Umma 
 Kaathirikkathe
Manushyaputhri
 Dany's as Ancy

Reality Shows
Tharasangamam (Asianet)
Malayalee House (Surya TV) - fourth runner up

TV Shows as a presenter
Merchants of India (Surya TV)
Dubai Shopping Festival
Vaalkannadi
Tang 'Quiz the Whiz'
Philips Top Ten
Paattupetti
Wedding Bells
May Flower
Huggies Baby Contest (judge)

Commercials
Geebon
 Emmanuval Silks
Big Bazar
Manu Granite Gallery
CDC Cashew
Kerala Times
Ano Washing Powder
Mazhavil FM
Vanitha
D Tabata
Kanyaka
Silk Yarns
Robinfood
Zomato Max Safety
KCBC Matrimony
Hyundai
TGM Jewels
Oppo
Jet On Travels

Other works

Short films

Play
 Swantham Lekhakan

References

External links

Actresses from Kozhikode
Actresses in Malayalam cinema
Living people
Indian film actresses
Actresses from Thiruvananthapuram
Year of birth missing (living people)
Indian television actresses
Actresses in Malayalam television
20th-century Indian actresses
21st-century Indian actresses
Actresses in Tamil television
Actresses in Telugu cinema
Actresses in Tamil cinema